Limonium puberulum, the downy sea lavender, is a species of flowering plant in the family Plumbaginaceae, native to subtropical elevations of Lanzarote in the Canary Islands. It is morphologically similar to but genetically distinct from Limonium bourgeaui.

References

puberulum
Halophytes
Endemic flora of the Canary Islands
Flora of Lanzarote
Plants described in 1891